Kirk Bramwith is a civil parish in the metropolitan borough of Doncaster, South Yorkshire, England.  The parish contains eleven listed buildings that are recorded in the National Heritage List for England.  Of these, one is listed at Grade II*, the middle of the three grades, and the others are at Grade II, the lowest grade.  The parish contains the villages of Kirk Bramwith and Braithwaite and the surrounding countryside.  Most of the listed buildings are houses, farmhouses and farm buildings, and the others consist of a church, items in the churchyard, and a bridge.


Key

Buildings

References

Citations

Sources

 

Lists of listed buildings in South Yorkshire
Buildings and structures in the Metropolitan Borough of Doncaster